Paulo Emilio Frossard Jorge (3 January 1936 – 17 May 2016) was a Brazilian football manager. He died at the age of 80 of a brain lymphoma in May 2016.

Managerial statistics
Source:

Honours

Manager
Desportiva
Campeonato Capixaba: 1967 
Torneio Início do Espírito Santo: 1967
Taça Cidade de Vitória: 1968

Nacional-AM
Campeonato Amazonense: 1972

Santa Cruz
Campeonato Pernambucano: 1973

Bahia
Campeonato Baiano: 1974

Fluminense
Campeonato Carioca: 1975
Taça Guanabara: 1975
Taça Rio: 1990

Vasco da Gama
Taça Guanabara: 1976

Sporting
Taça de Portugal: 1977-78

Goiás
Campeonato Goiano: 1981

Fortaleza
Campeonato Cearense: 1983

Cerezo Osaka
Japan Football League: 1994

References

External links

1936 births
2016 deaths
Brazilian football managers
Expatriate football managers in Portugal
Expatriate football managers in Saudi Arabia
Expatriate football managers in Japan
Campeonato Brasileiro Série A managers
Campeonato Brasileiro Série B managers
Primeira Liga managers
Saudi Professional League managers
J1 League managers
Associação Portuguesa de Desportos managers
Desportiva Ferroviária managers
America Football Club (RJ) managers
Nacional Futebol Clube managers
Santa Cruz Futebol Clube managers
Clube do Remo managers
Esporte Clube Bahia managers
Fluminense FC managers
CR Vasco da Gama managers
Guarani FC managers
Sporting CP managers
Goiás Esporte Clube managers
Paysandu Sport Club managers
Botafogo de Futebol e Regatas managers
Clube Náutico Capibaribe managers
Santos FC managers
Fortaleza Esporte Clube managers
São José Esporte Clube managers
Esporte Clube Noroeste managers
Al Hilal SFC managers
Club Athletico Paranaense managers
Cerezo Osaka managers
Brazilian footballers
Association football defenders